Nora Sylvia Abolins (born 7 December 1992) is a footballer who played as a goalkeeper. Born in Canada, she represented the Latvia national team.

Early life
Abolins was raised in Demorestville, Ontario.

College career
Abolins attended the University of Detroit Mercy in Detroit, Michigan and the Western Kentucky University in Bowling Green, Kentucky, both of them in the United States.

Club career
In 2015, she joined Durham United FC of League1 Ontario.  She helped lead the team to win the league title, playing all 18 league matches, while only conceding eight goals against.  Her performance resulted in her being named the League1 Ontario Goalkeeper of the Year and league Most Valuable Player honours.

Her performance with Durham attracted the attention of European teams and she joined QIBK Karlstad in the Elitettan, the Swedish second division in 2016. In 2017, she joined another Swedish side, Östersunds DFF. She later joined KIF Örebro of the top tier Damallsvenskan.

In 2021, she returned to League1 Ontario with Vaughan Azzurri.

International career
Her performance led to her being called up to the Latvian national team in the Baltic Cup and the Turkish women's national team tournament.

Coaching career
Afterwards, she joined Ryerson University as an assistant coach.

References

1992 births
Living people
Women's association football goalkeepers
Female association football managers
Women's association football managers
Latvian women's footballers
Latvia women's international footballers
Detroit Mercy Titans women's soccer players
Western Kentucky Lady Toppers soccer players
QBIK players
Damallsvenskan players
KIF Örebro DFF players
Latvian expatriate footballers
Latvian expatriate sportspeople in the United States
Expatriate women's soccer players in the United States
Latvian expatriate sportspeople in Sweden
Expatriate women's footballers in Sweden
Latvian football managers
Toronto Metropolitan University alumni
Latvian expatriate football managers
Expatriate soccer managers in the United States
Canadian women's soccer players
Soccer people from Ontario
Sportspeople from Belleville, Ontario
Canadian people of Latvian descent
Canadian expatriate soccer players
Canadian expatriate sportspeople in the United States
Canadian expatriate sportspeople in Sweden
Canadian women's soccer coaches
Vaughan Azzurri (women) players
League1 Ontario (women) players
Pickering FC (women) players